Sawai Man Singh Medical College, also known as SMS Medical College, is a government medical college in Jaipur, Rajasthan state, India. It was established in 1947 and was the 15th centre for medical education in India.

History 
SMS Medical College marks its start with the establishment of a maternity hospital, a dispensary and a medical school in Jaipur in 1855, officially inaugurated in 1861. However, this medical school was closed in 1864. It was only in 1945 that Mirza Ismail, the Diwan (Prime Minister) of the Jaipur State, started working on the project of establishing a medical college in the state, which was to be the 15th centre for medical education in India. The foundation stone was laid down by Lord Wavell, the Governor-General and Viceroy of India, on 13 March 1946 and Sawai Man Singh Medical College was officially opened in 1947.

The first principal of the college was G.N. Sen who was replaced shortly afterwards by S.C. Mehta. In 1951, S.K. Menon took over as principal. In 1952 the college was recognized by the Medical Council of India and postgraduate courses started in 1952.

Attached hospitals
A list of hospitals attached to the SMS Medical College. This list does not include the satellite hospitals in Jaipur.

 Sawai Man Singh Hospital
 Mahila Chikitsalaya
 Institute of Respiratory Diseases, Shastri Nagar. - specialized in treating respiratory ailments such as Tuberculosis, Lung cancer, Chronic obstructive pulmonary disease etc.
 Psychiatric Center
 Gangori Hospital
 JK Lon (SPMCHI - Sir Padampad Mother and Child Health Center)
 Zenana Hospital - specialised in gynaecology
 Isolation Hospital (for infectious diseases)
 HB Kanwatia Hospital
 State Cancer Institute

Notable alumni

 Mahendra Bhandari, Padma Shri
Farooq Abdullah, Former Chief Minister of J&K
Ashok Panagariya
Samin Sharma
Shiv Kumar Sarin
Chandrabhan Singh
S. P. Sudrania
Jyoti Mirdha
Veer Singh Mehta
RDX

Rankings

In 2020, SMS medical college was ranked 27th among medical college in India by NIRF.

References

External links

Educational institutions established in 1947
1947 establishments in India
Medical colleges in Jaipur
Medical colleges in Rajasthan
Affiliates of Rajasthan University of Health Sciences